The Master of Management (MM, MBM, MIM, MMgt) is a master’s degree comprising one or two years graduate level coursework in business management.   As the program is designed for students interested in entering leadership roles, the degree attracts applicants from diverse academic disciplines. The MM program structure is similar to that of the Master of Business Administration, Master of Arts in Management, and Master of Science in Management degrees.

A global survey of business schools offering MIM programs shows a robust growth in applications in times of global recession triggered by COVID-19. This growth in applications shows the demand for pre-experience programs among domestic and international candidates preparing for management careers.

Program structure
The mode delivery of the program can be full-time,  part-time, distance-learning, accelerated, or executive.

The MM program for younger professionals with limited professional experience often resembles an MBA program. It typically prepares students to handle management issues in all areas of business, with the option to concentrate or specialize in one area. Most programs begin with a set of required courses and then offer more specialized courses two thirds of the way through the program. Topics in the MM program often accounting, finance, business administration, international business, marketing management, supply chain management, human resources, nonprofit management, and entrepreneurship.

The MM program for senior professionals with managerial experience (typically 10+ years) often resembles an Executive MBA (EMBA) program. It typically prepares students to handle the tasks associated with interdisciplinary business-related subjects such as ethical decision making, business law, global business values, workplace security, corporate crime, and employee motivation.

Admissions
Business school admission committees normally evaluate applicants based on GPA score (and graduate GPA if applicable), resumes, letters of recommendation, essays, and personal interviews. Based on these indicators, a committee decides if the applicant is suitable for the academic profile of the program, can demonstrate considerable leadership potential, and contribute positively to the student body of the school as a whole.

See also
Doctor of Management
Master of Business Administration
Master of Science in Management
Bachelor of Management Studies

References

Master's degrees
Business qualifications
Management education